2015 France attacks may refer to:
January 2015 Île-de-France attacks, series of five attacks across the Île-de-France region, 7 January – 9 January
Charlie Hebdo shooting, shooting at satirical magazine, 7 January
Hypercacher Kosher Supermarket siege, attack on Kosher supermarket at Porte de Vincennes, 9 January
Saint-Quentin-Fallavier attack, suspected Islamist beheading and bombings, 26 June
2015 Thalys train attack, 21 August
November 2015 Paris attacks, a series of violent attacks on 13 November

See also 
 List of terrorist incidents in France, in peacetime from 1800 to the present
 Paris attacks (disambiguation)